Golgi-associated olfactory signaling regulator is a protein that in humans is encoded by the GFY gene. This protein is required for proper olfactory system function.

References